Carin Bartosch Edström (born 1965 in Malmö) is a Swedish composer and author, and is especially interested in opera.

Biography 
Bartosch Edström had an international upbringing. Though she spent some time in the United States, she lived in Rome, Italy and Lund, Sweden for most of her childhood. While in Italy, she received voice training.

Bartosch Edström studied composition with Rolf Martinsson, Hans Gefors, Lars Ekström, Lars-Erik Rosell, and Sven-David Sandström. She graduated from Lund University's Malmö Academy of Music in 1999 with a degree in composition. She founded the Skanör/Falsterbo chamber music festival and was director of the Musica Vitae chamber music orchestra in Växjö from 1990 to 1992. In 2000, she was elected to the Society of Swedish Composers.

In 2011, Edström's debut crime novel, Furioso, was published. It followed the action surrounding the lives of a Swedish female string quartet.

Compositions 
Stage
Trassel på tråden, Opera (1999); libretto by the composer
Huvudsaken (The Main Thing), Opera in one act (2005); libretto by Kerstin Perski

Orchestral
Playtime for string orchestra (1996)

Wind band
Cyd Cybersonix Meets Webby Web Webster (1998)

Concertante
Kansas Epidemix for violin, cello and string orchestra (1994)
Luce promessa for cello and orchestra (1996)

Chamber and instrumental music
Persephone's Dream for flute and piano (1988)
Claudia Goes Shopping for recorder (1995)
Fluctuat nec mergitur for violin, viola, cello and piano (1995)
Happiness Is a G-String for solo viola (1996)
Redan morgon! (As Soon as Tomorrow!) for solo clarinet (2004)
Asthmose for 2 violins (2006)

Vocal
Astrakanerna, 4 Songs for soprano, violin and cello (1996); words by Marie Lundquist
Sorgegondolen, Song Cycle for soprano, bass clarinet and piano (1996); based on The Sorrow Gondola by Tomas Tranströmer
Sommer-Refektorium for soprano, violin, viola, cello and percussion (1998)
September 1918, 3 Songs for soprano and violin (1999) or for soprano and piano (2004); words by Edith Södergran
Fyra nattliga sånger (Four Nocturnal Songs) for alto and piano (2011); words by Edith Södergran

Choral
Winterweihe for mixed chorus a cappella (1997); words by Henkell

Novels 
Furioso (2011)

External links 
Mord i stråkkvartetten (Murder in the String Quartet), an article about the novel Furioso. (In Swedish)

References 

1965 births
Living people
Writers from Malmö
20th-century classical composers
21st-century classical composers
Swedish classical composers
Women classical composers
Swedish opera composers
Swedish crime fiction writers
Writers from Scania
Lund University alumni
Women opera composers
Musicians from Malmö
Swedish women composers
20th-century women composers
21st-century women composers
20th-century Swedish writers